Andy Delort (born 9 October 1991) is a professional footballer who plays as a striker for Ligue 1 club Nantes, on loan from Nice, and the Algeria national team.

Born in France, Delort was a France under-20 youth international, before representing Algeria at senior level. He has also represented the France beach soccer team. For the 2013–14 Ligue 2 season, Delort was named in the Team of the Year and nominated for Player of the Year.

Career

Early career
Delort was born in Sète, France, to a father of Romani descent, and a mother of Algerian descent. He started his career at Sète. He joined Ajaccio in 2008, having finished top scorer at France U19 league level with 30 goals. After coming through Ajaccio's youth ranks, he attracted interest from Bordeaux and Borussia Dortmund. After enjoying a trial at Borussia Dortmund, playing in the reserve team with Mario Götze and Shinji Kagawa, Dortmund offered him a contract. However, he chose to join Nîmes because of manager Jean-Michel Cavalli, claiming "a player who leapfrogs, burns his wings". Delort also turned down a contract offer from Bordeaux.

Delort played his first game of Ligue 2 for Nîmes on 30 August 2009, coming on as a 53rd-minute substitute against Metz. During the season, he was rarely used in the first team making only three substitute appearances.

Ajaccio and loan to Metz
Delort re-joined his original club, AC Ajaccio, in June 2010. He scored his first two goals at professional level on 15 September 2010 against Le Havre in the French League Cup, before achieving his first goals in the Coupe de France on 12 November 2010. His first Ligue 2 goals contributed to victories against Angers on 17 December 2010 and against Istres. He signed his first professional contract for three and a half years with AC Ajaccio on 28 January 2011. On 11 March 2011, he was one of the players involved in a mass brawl when he was replaced in the match against Nantes. As a result of the incident, several players were given suspensions; both Delort and his teammate Carl Medjani received four-match bans. He earned promotion to Ligue 1 with AC Ajaccio during the 2010–11 season, after finishing 2nd in the league.

On 31 January 2012, Delort signed a six-month loan deal with Ligue 2 club Metz, where he scored 1 goal in 13 appearances.

He returned to AC Ajaccio for the 2012–13 season, and scored his first goal in Ligue 1 on 27 April 2013 in a 2–1 win over Montpellier. In that season, he made 16 appearances in Ligue 1. In the same season, he scored 12 goals in 16 appearances for the club's reserve team.

Tours
In the summer of 2013, Delort joined Ligue 2 side Tours. He finished the 2013–14 season as joint top scorer in Ligue 2, scoring 24 goals in 36 matches and was named in the Ligue 2 Team of the Year, as well as receiving a nomination for the Ligue 2 Player of the Year, eventually finishing runner-up to Metz's Diafra Sakho for the award.

Wigan Athletic
On deadline day of the summer 2014 transfer window, Delort signed for Championship side Wigan Athletic for a fee reported to be under £3 million. He was given the number 49 shirt. Delort struggled at Wigan and amassed only 11 league appearances for the club, failing to score in any of them. In an interview with Hat Trick, he admitted that he had struggled to settle at Wigan following his sudden upheaval from France.

Return to Tours on loan
Having not been able to settle well in England, Delort re-joined Tours on loan until the end of the season on transfer deadline day in the summer of 2015. In doing so, he opted to take a 50% pay cut in order to obtain regular playing time again.

Caen
Delort completed a transfer to Caen on 2 July 2015. In his debut with Caen, he scored his first goal in a 1–0 defeat of Marseille on 8 August 2015. At the start of the following season, Delort refused to attend training during a protracted transfer saga with Liga MX side Tigres UANL.

Tigres UANL
On 2 September 2016, Delort's transfer to Tigres was officially announced becoming the second French player to join the team after André-Pierre Gignac. He signed a four-year contract while the transfer fee paid to Caen was reported as €8 million. On 22 October 2016, he scored his first goal in Liga MX with Tigres, against UNAM at the Estadio Olímpico Universitario in a 3–1 victory. He spent less than six months at the club, however, scoring 3 goals in 14 appearances, before returning to France to join Toulouse.

Toulouse 
On 26 January 2017, Delort returned to France, joining Toulouse on a reported four-year contract and for a reported transfer fee of €6 million. He scored on his debut for the club on 2 February, netting the opening goal in a 4–0 win over Angers, and repeated the feat in his next two appearances against Lorient and Bastia.

Montpellier 
On 24 July 2018, Delort was loaned to Montpellier until the end of the 2018–19 season with an option to buy. On 12 June 2019, Delort signed permanently with Montpellier. There, he scored a total of 41 goals across all competitions, beating Olivier Giroud's record and became the 3rd best striker of Montpellier in the 21st century.

Nice 
On 28 August 2021, Delort signed with fellow Ligue 1 side Nice on a 4-year deal. On 21 May 2022, he scored his first Ligue 1 hat-trick in a 3–2 victory over Reims.

Nantes 
On 30 January 2023, Delort moved to fellow French club Nantes, initially on a six month loan with an obligation to buy. He scored his first two goals with Nantes during a Coupe de France quarter finals against RC Lens in 1 March 2023.

International career
Delort played in the beach soccer team managed by Eric Cantona in 2009. During an amateur tournament in Sète, he was spotted by Laurent Castro, who asked him to play in the qualification for the 2009 World Cup. He scored five goals in the qualifiers.

In 2011, he was selected by France Under 20s team by Francis Smerecki to play against the United States on 17 May 2011. He was then called to participate in the 2011 Toulon Tournament in June with the France team, but had to pull out of the squad having suffered an injury in a league game.

Of Algerian descent through his mother, Delort expressed an interest in representing the Algeria national football team in April 2019.

On 13 June 2019, the Algerian federation announced Delort's inclusion in its final squad for the 2019 Africa Cup of Nations. He made his debut three days later in a friendly against Mali, coming on as a substitute for Yacine Brahimi in the 75th minute and scoring the winning goal 5 minutes later in a 3–2 victory.

In October 2021, Delort was not called up to the national team for the recent World Cup qualifiers. Coach Djamel Belmadi revealed at a press conference that Delort himself refused the call-up because he wanted to concentrate on his club career, having recently signed with OGC Nice. Delort confirmed this and said he wanted to take a break from the national team for a year.

Personal life
Delort has two children, a son and a daughter. In January 2021, he received the medal of his hometown, Sète  from the hands of the mayor François Commeinhes.

Career statistics

Club

International

Scores and results list Algeria's goal tally first.

Honours
Tigres UANL
Liga MX: Apertura 2016
Nice
 Coupe de France runner-up: 2021–22
Algeria
 Africa Cup of Nations: 2019
Individual
 Ligue 2 Top Goalscorer: 2013–14; 24 goals
 UNFP Ligue 2 Team of the Year: 2013–14
 UNFP Ligue 2 Player of the Month: March 2014
UNFP Ligue 1 Player of the Month: November 2020

References

External links
 
 
 
 
 
 Nantes profile

1991 births
Living people
People from Sète
Sportspeople from Hérault
Association football forwards
Algerian footballers
Algeria international footballers
French footballers
France youth international footballers
Algerian people of French descent
French sportspeople of Algerian descent
French people of Romani descent
French expatriate footballers
2019 Africa Cup of Nations players
Ligue 1 players
Ligue 2 players
English Football League players
Liga MX players
Nîmes Olympique players
AC Ajaccio players
FC Metz players
Tours FC players
Wigan Athletic F.C. players
Stade Malherbe Caen players
Tigres UANL footballers
Toulouse FC players
Montpellier HSC players
OGC Nice players
FC Nantes players
French expatriate sportspeople in Mexico
Expatriate footballers in England
Expatriate footballers in Mexico
French beach soccer players
Footballers from Occitania (administrative region)